Young, Loud and Snotty is the first studio album by the American punk band Dead Boys. It was recorded and released in 1977 on Sire Records, produced by Genya Ravan. The album is the only Dead Boys album to chart, peaking at 189 on the Billboard 200 in November 1977.

The album was included at #7 on the Rolling Stone "10 Greatest Punk Rock Albums" reader poll.

Release
The album was originally released in October 1977 by Sire Records on LP, cassette and 8-track. In 1992, the album was first released on CD, and re-released on cassette, under the Sire name as part of Warner Bros. Records' Plundering the Vaults line. These releases featured a bonus track, "Not Anymore/Ain't Nothin' to Do (Medley)", which was originally released on the "Tell Me" 7" in 1978.

Track listing
All tracks composed by Stiv Bators, Cheetah Chrome & Jimmy Zero; except where indicated.

 "Sonic Reducer" (David Thomas, Cheetah Chrome) – 3:05
 "All This and More" – 2:49
 "What Love Is" – 2:08
 "Not Anymore" – 3:38
 "Ain't Nothin' to Do" – 2:25
 "Caught with the Meat in Your Mouth" – 2:06
 "Hey Little Girl" (Bob Gonzales, Don Baskin) – 3:01 (Recorded live at CBGB)
 "I Need Lunch" – 3:36
 "High Tension Wire" – 3:05
 "Down in Flames" – 2:15
 "Not Anymore/Ain't Nothin' to Do" – 7:15 (bonus track on CD releases)

Cassette and 8-track
The album was re-arranged for the original cassette and 8-track releases
 "Sonic Reducer"
 "Not Anymore"
 "All This and More"
 "What Love Is"
 "Ain't Nothin' to Do"
 ""Caught with the Meat in Your Mouth"
 "Hey Little Girl"
 "Down in Flames"
 "I Need Lunch"
 "High Tension Wire"

40th anniversary re-recording
In 2017, founding members Cheetah Chrome and Johnny Blitz reformed Dead Boys with a new lineup and re-recorded Young, Loud and Snotty. Still Snotty: Young, Loud and Snotty at 40 was released on September 8, 2017.

Personnel
Dead Boys
Stiv Bators - vocals
Cheetah Chrome - lead guitar
Jimmy Zero - rhythm guitar
Jeff Magnum - bass guitar
Johnny Blitz - drums
with:
Ronald Binder - voice on "Down in Flames"
Bob Clearmountain - bass guitar

Production
Arranged by Dead Boys
Produced by Genya Ravan
Recorded and engineered by Dave Wittman
Assistant recording engineer: Jim Galante
Mixed by Harvey Goldberg
Mastered by Ted Jensen

References

Further reading

External links
"Young, Loud and Snotty" at discogs

1977 debut albums
Dead Boys albums
Sire Records albums
Albums recorded at Electric Lady Studios